The Aquarium Garage Development, was a proposed supertall skyscraper in Boston, Massachusetts. Aquarium Garage Development was intended to be tied as the tallest building in Boston, with Trans National Place.

The project was cancelled in 2012.

See also 
 List of tallest buildings in Boston

References

Buildings and structures in Boston
Proposed skyscrapers in the United States